Rodney M. Hall (born July 25, 1928) is an American former politician in the state of South Dakota. He was a member of the South Dakota Senate from 1971 to 1976. He attended Dakota Wesleyan University and the University of South Dakota where he earned a master's degree in education. He is a veteran of the Korean War and later worked as an educator in Iowa, California, Minnesota, along with South Dakota, as a teacher, supervisor, and principal.

References

Living people
1928 births
Democratic Party South Dakota state senators
People from Turner County, South Dakota
Dakota Wesleyan University alumni
University of South Dakota alumni
American military personnel of the Korean War
People from Hanson County, South Dakota
People from Mitchell, South Dakota